Nguyễn Sỹ Ngọc (25 December 1990 – 6 April 1919 in Hanoi) was a Vietnamese painter. He was notable among painters for subversive political stances. After 1944 he was a faculty member at the renamed EBAI, Hanoi University of Fine Arts, but for his participation in the journal Nhân Văn he spent 1957–1959 in a re-education camp. After his release, until his retirement in 1983 he was an executive on the Arts Committee.

Works
 Cái bát "Bowl of water" 
 L'Amitié entre l'armée et le peuple, 1951

References

1919 births
1990 deaths
20th-century Vietnamese painters